The Culture of Pakistan is unique in terms of its social values revolving around the religion of Islam. The region has formed a distinct cultural unit within the main cultural complex of South Asia, Middle East and Central Asia. There are differences in culture among the different ethnic groups in matters such as dress, food, and religion, especially where pre-Islamic customs differ from Islamic practices. 

The existence of Pakistan as an Islamic state since 1956 has led to the large-scale injection of Islam into most aspects of Pakistani culture and everyday life, which has accordingly impacted the historical values and traditions of the Muslim-majority population. Marriages and other major events are significantly impacted by regional differences in culture, but generally follow Islamic jurisprudence where required.

Civil society in Pakistan is largely hierarchical, emphasising local cultural etiquette and traditional Islamic values that govern personal and political life. The basic family unit is the extended family, although for socio-economic reasons there has been a growing trend towards nuclear families. The traditional dress for both men and women is the shalwar kameez; trousers, jeans, and shirts are also popular among men. In recent decades, the middle class has increased to around 35 million and the upper and upper-middle classes to around 17 million, and power is shifting from rural landowners to the urbanised elites. Pakistani festivals, including Eid-ul-Fitr, Eid-ul-Azha, Ramazan, Christmas, Easter, Holi, and Diwali, are mostly religious in origin. Increasing globalisation has resulted in Pakistan ranking 56th on the A.T. Kearney/FP Globalization Index.

Literature

Pakistan has literature in Urdu, Sindhi, Punjabi, Pashto, Baluchi, Persian, English, and many other languages. The Pakistan Academy of Letters is a large literary community that promotes literature and poetry in Pakistan and abroad. The National Library publishes and promotes literature in the country. Before the 19th century, Pakistani literature consisted mainly of lyric and religious poetry and mystical and folkloric works. During the colonial period, native literary figures were influenced by western literary realism and took up increasingly varied topics and narrative forms. Prose fiction is now very popular.

The national poet of Pakistan, Muhammad Iqbal, wrote poetry in Urdu and Persian. He was a strong proponent of the political and spiritual revival of Islamic civilisation and encouraged Muslims all over the world to bring about a successful revolution. Well-known figures in contemporary Pakistani Urdu literature include Josh Malihabadi Faiz Ahmed Faiz and Saadat Hasan Manto. Sadequain and Gulgee are known for their calligraphy and paintings. The Sufi poets Shah Abdul Latif, Bulleh Shah, Mian Muhammad Bakhsh, and Khawaja Farid enjoy considerable popularity in Pakistan. Mirza Kalich Beg has been termed the father of modern Sindhi prose. Historically, philosophical development in the country was dominated by Muhammad Iqbal, Sir Syed Ahmad Khan, Muhammad Asad, Maududi, and Mohammad Ali Johar.

Ideas from British and American philosophy greatly shaped philosophical development in Pakistan. Analysts such as M. M. Sharif and Zafar Hassan established the first major Pakistani philosophical movement in 1947. After the 1971 war, philosophers such as Jalaludin Abdur Rahim, Gianchandani, and Malik Khalid incorporated Marxism into Pakistan's philosophical thinking. Influential work by Manzoor Ahmad, Jon Elia, Hasan Askari Rizvi, and Abdul Khaliq brought mainstream social, political, and analytical philosophy to the fore in academia. Works by Noam Chomsky have influenced philosophical ideas in various fields of social and political philosophy.

Performing arts

Music

Pakistani music ranges from diverse forms of provincial folk music and traditional styles such as Qawwali and Ghazal Gayaki to modern musical forms that fuse traditional and western music. Pakistan has many famous folk singers. The arrival of Afghan refugees in the western provinces has stimulated interest in Pashto music, although there has been intolerance of it in some places.

Dances
Pakistan has various regional dances including:

Punjabi

 Dahamal – Punjabi folk dance
 Bhangra – Punjabi folk dance
 Jhumar – Saraiki folk dance

Balochi
 Chaap – Baloch folk dance performed at weddings

Pashtun
 Attan – Folk dance of Pashtuns tribes of Pakistan including the unique styles of Quetta and Waziristan
 Khattak Dance –  Sword dance of Khattak tribe in Khyber Pakhtunkhwa

Sindhi

 Ho Jamalo – Sindhi dance

Drama and theatre 

These are very similar to stage plays in theatres. They are performed by well-known actors and actresses in the Lollywood industry. The dramas and plays often deal with themes from everyday life, often with a humorous touch.

Architecture 

Four periods are recognised in Pakistani architecture: pre-Islamic, Islamic, colonial, and post-colonial. With the beginning of the Indus civilization around the middle of the 3rd millennium BCE, an advanced urban culture developed for the first time in the region, with large buildings, some of which survive to this day.  The rise of Buddhism and the influence of Greek civilisation led to the development of a Greco-Buddhist style, starting from the 1st century CE. The high point of this era was the Gandhara style. An example of Buddhist architecture is the ruins of the Buddhist monastery Takht-i-Bahi in Khyber Pakhtunkhwa.

The arrival of Islam in what is today Pakistan meant the sudden end of Buddhist architecture in the area and a smooth transition to the predominantly pictureless Islamic architecture. The most important Indo-Islamic-style building still standing is the tomb of Shah Rukn-i-Alam in Multan. During the Mughal era, design elements of Persian-Islamic architecture were fused with and often produced playful forms of Hindustani art. Lahore, as the occasional residence of Mughal rulers, contains many important buildings from the empire. Most prominent among them are the Badshahi Mosque, the fortress of Lahore with the famous Alamgiri Gate, the colourful, Mughal-style Wazir Khan Mosque, the Shalimar Gardens in Lahore, and the Shahjahan Mosque in Thatta. 

In the British colonial period, predominantly functional buildings of the Indo-European representative style developed from a mixture of European and Indian-Islamic components. Post-colonial national identity is expressed in modern structures such as the Faisal Mosque, the Minar-e-Pakistan, and the Mazar-e-Quaid. Several examples of architectural infrastructure demonstrating the influence of British design can be found in Lahore, Peshawar, and Karachi.

Recreation and sports

Most sports played in Pakistan originated and were substantially developed by athletes and sports fans from the United Kingdom who introduced them during the British Raj. Field hockey is the national sport of Pakistan; it has won three gold medals in the Olympic Games held in 1960, 1968, and 1984. Pakistan has also won the Hockey World Cup a record four times, held in 1971, 1978, 1982, and 1994.

Cricket, however, is the most popular game across the country. The country has had an array of success in the sport over the years, and has the distinct achievement of having won each of the major ICC international cricket tournaments: ICC Cricket World Cup, ICC World Twenty20, and ICC Champions Trophy; as well as the ICC Test Championship. The cricket team (known as Shaheen) won the Cricket World Cup held in 1992; it was runner-up once, in 1999. Pakistan was runner-up in the inaugural World Twenty20 (2007) in South Africa and won the World Twenty20 in England in 2009. In March 2009, militants attacked the touring Sri Lankan cricket team, after which no international cricket was played in Pakistan until May 2015, when the Zimbabwean team agreed to a tour. Pakistan also won the 2017 ICC Champions Trophy by defeating arch-rivals India in the final.

Association football is the second-most played sport in Pakistan and it is organised and regulated by the Pakistan Football Federation. Football in Pakistan is as old as the country itself. Shortly after the creation of Pakistan in 1947, the Pakistan Football Federation (PFF) was created, and Muhammad Ali Jinnah became its first Patron-in-Chief. The highest football division in Pakistan is the Pakistan Premier League. Pakistan is known as one of the best manufacturers of the official FIFA World Cup ball. The best football players to play for Pakistan are Kaleemullah, Zesh Rehman, Muhammad Essa, Haroon Yousaf, and Muhammad Adil.

Pakistan has hosted or co-hosted several international sporting events: the 1989 and 2004 South Asian Games; the 1984, 1993, 1996 and 2003 World Squash Championships; the 1987 and 1996 Cricket World Cup; and the 1990 Hockey World Cup. Pakistan is set to host the 2024 South Asian Games.

There are also some traditional games of Pakistan, such as kabaddi, which are popular.

Cuisine

Pakistani cuisine is similar to that of other regions of South Asia, with some of it being originated from the royal kitchens of 16th-century Mughal emperors. Most of those dishes have their roots in British, Indian, Central Asian and Middle Eastern cuisine. Unlike Middle Eastern cuisine, Pakistani cooking uses large quantities of spices, herbs, and seasoning. Garlic, ginger, turmeric, red chili, and garam masala are used in most dishes, and home cooking regularly includes curry, roti, a thin flatbread made from wheat, is a staple food, usually served with curry, meat, vegetables, and lentils. Rice is also common; it is served plain, fried with spices, and in sweet dishes.

Lassi is a traditional drink in the Punjab region.  Sohan halwa is a popular sweet dish from the southern region of Punjab province and is enjoyed all over Pakistan.

Pakistani tea culture 

Black tea with milk and sugar is popular throughout Pakistan and is consumed daily by most of the population. The consumption of tea in Pakistan, called chai, in Urdu, is of central significance to Pakistani culture. It is one of the most consumed beverages in Pakistani cuisine. Pakistan does produce its own limited tea in Shinkiari farms, however it ranks as the third largest importer of tea in the world. In 2003, as much as 109,000 tonnes of tea were consumed in Pakistan, ranking it at seven on the list of tea-consuming countries in the world.

 Pakistani tea was praised by Abhinandan Varthaman, an Indian Airforce Pilot who was shot down by Pakistan Air Force and captured by Pakistan Army for violating Pakistani airspace during Operation Swift Retort. In a video released by ISPR, Wing Commander Abhinandan is seen conversing with Pakistan military officials in a congenial environment and acknowledging that he has been treated well while enjoying Pakistani Tea. Upon being asked about the tea, Abhinandan replied "The tea is fantastic". This became a catchphrase in Pakistan as customers began using it to order tea.
 The name for Three Cups of Tea, a bestselling book by American mountaineer and educator Greg Mortenson, is taken from the Balti proverb in northern Pakistan: "The first time you share tea with a Balti, you are a stranger.  The second time you take tea, you are an honored guest. The third time you share a cup of tea, you become family..."
 The British documentary film Tracing Tea briefly covers tea culture in Pakistan.
 Pak Tea House – a tea cafe in Lahore famously known for being visited by prominent academic intellectuals and literary personalities from all walks of life.

Popular media

The private print media, state-owned Pakistan Television Corporation (PTV), and Pakistan Broadcasting Corporation (PBC) for radio were the dominant media outlets until the beginning of the 21st century. Pakistan now has a large network of domestic, privately owned 24-hour news media and television channels. A 2016 report by the Reporters Without Borders ranked Pakistan 147th on the Press Freedom Index, while at the same time terming the Pakistani media "among the freest in Asia when it comes to covering the squabbling among politicians." The BBC terms the Pakistani media "among the most outspoken in South Asia". Pakistani media has also played a vital role in exposing corruption.

The Lollywood, Punjabi and Pashto film industry is based in Karachi, Lahore and Peshawar. While Bollywood films were banned from public cinemas from 1965 until 2008, they have remained an important part of popular culture. In contrast to the ailing Pakistani film industry, Urdu televised dramas and theatrical performances continue to be popular, as many entertainment media outlets air them regularly. Urdu dramas dominate the television entertainment industry, which has launched critically acclaimed miniseries and featured popular actors and actresses since the 1990s. In the 1960s–1970s, pop music and disco (1970s) dominated the country's music industry. In the 1980s–1990s, British influenced rock music appeared and jolted the country's entertainment industry. In the 2000s, heavy metal music gained popular and critical acclaim.

National dress

The national dress of Pakistan is the shalwar kameez, a unisex garment widely-worn, and national dress, of Pakistan. When women wear the shalwar-kameez in some regions, they usually wear a long scarf or shawl called a dupatta around the head or neck. The dupatta is also employed as a form of modesty—although it is made of delicate material, it obscures the upper body's contours by passing over the shoulders. For Muslim women, the dupatta is a less stringent alternative to the chador or burqa (see hijab and purdah). Besides the national dress, domestically tailored suits and neckties are often worn by men, and are customary in offices, schools, and social gatherings.

The fashion industry has flourished in the changing environment of the fashion world. Since Pakistan came into being, its fashion has evolved in different phases and developed a unique identity. Today, Pakistani fashion is a combination of traditional and modern dress and has become a mark of Pakistani culture. Despite modern trends, regional and traditional forms of dress have developed their own significance as a symbol of native tradition. This regional fashion continues to evolve into both more modern and purer forms. The Pakistan Fashion Design Council based in Lahore organizes PFDC Fashion Week and the Fashion Pakistan Council based in Karachi organizes Fashion Pakistan Week. Pakistan's first fashion week was held in November 2009.

See also
 History of Pakistan
 Punjabis
 Pashtuns
 Sindhis
 Baloch people
 Kashmiris
 Balti people

References

External links

 
+